"Trinka Trinka" is Olivia's sixth mini-album. It was released on September 17, 2008. Unlike her last mini-album, there are no preceding singles.

Two versions of the album are planned to be released, a CD only version and a limited CD+DVD version. The CD+DVD version will include an accompanying music clip for "Rain" while the CD only version comes with an "Olivia Art & Photo Book" (while supplies last).

Aside from "Rain", the album will consist of all new material, however, it will include the much anticipated song "Real Love" which was showcased during her previous concert in Paris, France at La Locomotive, but renamed to "Your Smile". "Rain" was featured as the second ending theme song for K-tai Investigator 7, a 2008 Japanese television drama directed by Takashi Miike.

Track listings
CD Track listing
 "Trinka Trinka"
 "Rain"
 "Because"
 "Collecting Sparkles"
 "Miss You"
 "Your Smile"
DVD Track listing
 "Rain Music clip"

References

External links

Olivia Lufkin albums
2008 EPs
2008 video albums
Avex Group video albums
Avex Group EPs
Japanese-language EPs